Genius is a 2012 released Indian Telugu film directed by Ohmkar. Made on a budget of Rs. 110 million Genius features Havish, Sanusha, Vinoth Kishan and Abhinaya in the lead while Tamil actor R. Sarath Kumar will be seen in an important role. Composer Joshua Sridhar has given the music for the film produced by Dasari Kiran Kumar. Writer Chinni Krishna, who has penned down stories for blockbuster Telugu movies such as "Narasimha Naidu", "Indra" and "Gangotri" has written the film's narrative. The presence of Sarathkumar in a prominent role led to makers to dub the film in Tamil as Acham Thavir.

Plot 
This story is about a genius who failed in life.

Cast

Soundtrack
The music was composed by Joshua Sridhar and released by Mango Music.

Release 

Genius received mixed reviews as audience praised its story and music but the movie met its doom in length of the movie and the screen play the director 
Omkar concluded that movie bombed at box office due to his lack of strength in narrating the movie to the spectators.

He also concluded that the film was more expensive than it should be and should have been including some depth in the scenes the movie failed to meet its budget and fairly disappointed the producers but it also brought in the directorial talent of Omkar who already was a famous anchor and a bunch of good and young talented people.

References

External links
 

2012 films
2010s Telugu-language films
2012 directorial debut films
Films scored by Joshua Sridhar
Films directed by Ohmkar